Langmani Haduk is a 1993 Tripuri feature film in Kokborok language directed by Ruhi Debbarma that portrayed patriarchal norms through what may be referred to as "feudal familial romance." It took inspiration from the well-established social/family melodramas of Hindi cinema.

See also 

 Kokborok Cinema
 List of Kokborok-language films

References

External links 
 

Cinema of Tripura
Cinema by culture
Films shot in Tripura
Kokborok
1993 films
Kokborok-language films